Tillandsia sodiroi is a species of flowering plant in the family Bromeliaceae. It is endemic to Ecuador.  Its natural habitat is subtropical or tropical moist montane forests. It is threatened by habitat loss.

References

Flora of Ecuador
sodiroi
Vulnerable plants
Taxonomy articles created by Polbot